MGA, MAX dimerization protein is a protein that in humans is encoded by the MGA gene.

References

Further reading